The 1st NACAC Under-25 Championships in Athletics were held in Monterrey, Nuevo León,
Mexico on August 3–5, 2000.  This year and in 2002 the event was open for athletes younger than 25 years.

Medal summary
Medal winners are published.
Complete results can be found on the AtletismoCR, on the CFPI, and the Nevis Amateur Athletic Association websites.

Men

Women

Medal table

Team Scores

Team scores were published.

Participation
The participation of 184 athletes from 21 countries was reported.

 (1)
 (2)
 (7)
 (16)
 (2)
 (2)
 (20)
 (1)
 (1)
 (2)
 (6)
 (8)
 México (64)
 (1)
 (2)
 (5)
 (1)
 (1)
 (2)
 (4)
 (36)

References

 

NACAC Under-23 Championships in Athletics
2000 in Mexican sports
NACAC U23 Championships
International athletics competitions hosted by Mexico
August 2000 sports events in Mexico